Lottioidea is a superfamily of sea snails or limpets, marine gastropod mollusks in the clade Patellogastropoda, the true limpets.

2005 taxonomy
There are three families within Lottioidea in the taxonomy of the Gastropoda by Bouchet & Rocroi (2005):
Family Lottiidae J. E. Gray, 1840
Family Acmaeidae E. Forbes, 1850
Family Lepetidae J. E. Gray, 1850

2007 taxonomy 
Based on molecular research on the Patellogastropoda by Nakano & Ozawa (2007) there were eight families in Lottioidea:
 family Acmaeidae Forbes, 1850
 † family Daminilidae Horný, 1961
 family Eoacmaeidae T. Nakano & Ozawa, 2007
 family Erginidae Chernyshev, 2018
 family Lepetidae Gray, 1850
 † family Lepetopsidae McLean, 1990
 family Lottiidae Gray, 1840
 family Neolepetopsidae  McLean, 1990
 family Pectinodontidae Pilsbry, 1891
Families and subfamilies brought into synonymy
 Bertiniidae Jousseaume, 1883: synonym of Nacellidae Thiele, 1891
 Lottidae [sic] : synonym of Lottiidae Gray, 1840
 Propilidiidae: synonym of Lepetidae Gray, 1850
 Rhodopetalinae Linddberg, 1981: synonym of Acmaeidae Forbes, 1850 (a junior synonym)
 Tecturidae Gray, 1847 accepted as Tecturinae Gray, 1847 (original rank)

2017 taxonomy

According to the revised taxonomy of Bouchet et al (2017), the Lottioidea contains the following families:

 Family Lottiidae J. E. Gray, 1840
 Family Acmaeidae E. Forbes, 1850
 Family Damilinidae Horný, 196125
 Family Lepetidae J. E. Gray, 1850
 Family Lepetopsidae McLean, 199027
 Family Nacellidae Thiele, 1891 
 Family Neolepetopsidae McLean, 199029
 Family Pectinodontidae Pilsbry, 1891

References 

 
Patellogastropoda
Taxa named by John Edward Gray